Natalie Bergman is an American singer-songwriter. She is one half of the duo Wild Belle, along with her brother Elliot Bergman. Her debut solo album, Mercy, was released on Third Man Records on May 7, 2021. She is based in Los Angeles.

Early life
Bergman was raised in Barrington, Illinois, a suburb of Chicago, to Judson and Susan Bergman. She attended Francis W. Parker School in Chicago, and studied at Berklee College of Music in Boston. Bergman is a devout Christian.

Career
After moving to New York, Bergman started out as a member of her brother Elliot's band Nomo, adding vocals to the 2011 Nomo and Shawn Lee single "Upside Down". She was fired from Nomo, but then she and Elliot formed the psychedelic pop duo Wild Belle. Wild Belle has released three albums: Isles (2013), Dreamland (2016), and Everybody One of a Kind (2019).

In 2019, Bergman's father and stepmother were killed by a drunk driver in a car accident. Bergman then spent a week in a silent retreat at The Monastery of Christ in the Desert in Chama Valley in New Mexico. The resulting gospel-folk album, Mercy, is a reflection on the tragedy, and on Bergman's own spirituality. Her debut solo album, it was recorded in Los Angeles at her brother Elliot's home studio. In July 2021, she released two tracks with Beck: a cover of Lion's 1975 soul single "You've Got a Woman" and Beck's remix of "Paint the Rain" from Mercy.

On September 30, 2021, she released the EP Live at Electric Lady on Spotify, part of a series of live performances at Electric Lady Studios. It features seven songs from her album Mercy and a cover of Jimi Hendrix's "Angel". On November 5, 2021, she released the four-song EP Keep Those Teardrops From Falling. On July 29, 2022, she released the single "The Little Bird" as part of For the Birds: The Birdsong Project, Volume III.

Discography

Albums

EPs

Singles
 "Talk to the Lord" (2021)
 "Shine Your Light on Me" (2021)
 "Home at Last" (2021)
 "Paint the Rain (Pachyman Remix)" (2021)
 "Paint the Rain (Beck Remix)" (2021)
 "You've Got a Woman" feat. Beck (2021)
 "The Little Bird" (2022)

References

External links 
 

Living people
21st-century American singers
Third Man Records artists
Musicians from Chicago
People from Barrington, Illinois
Berklee College of Music alumni
Francis W. Parker School (Chicago) alumni
1989 births